The JW Marriott Hotel Shanghai is a flagship hotel of the Marriott Group in Shanghai, China, opened on October, 2003. It is housed at Tomorrow Square, Which is the tallest building in downtown Puxi. House has 60 floor, 342 rooms, 77 suites, 3 restaurants and parking.

Architecture 

With a height of 60 stories (283 metres), Tomorrow Square stands as the tallest building in downtown Puxi.  Well known locals such as the Shanghai Grand Theatre, the Shanghai Museum, Shanghai Art Museum, Xin Tian Di, Nanjing Pedestrian Walk, and the Bund are just a few of the places accessible by foot.

Tomorrow Square was designed by Richards Mixon of John Portman & Associates. It houses the JW Marriott Hotel Shanghai and the Tomorrow Square, Shanghai - Marriott Executive Apartments.  
 
At the base of Tomorrow Square is a four-story plaza reserved for commercial purposes while 360 Gourmet Shop is on the ground floor. Parkway Health and University of Maryland Rober H Smith - School of Business are both located on the 4th floor.

The fifth floor accommodates the business centre at the JW Marriott Hotel Shanghai, including a total of 13 meeting rooms and other facilities, as well as JW’s Ballroom, the Junior Ballroom, and other subsidiary function and pre-function spaces.  The Health Club gymnasium as well as Mandara Spa - a branch of Asia’s leading spa operator – is situated on the sixth floor while the seventh-floor features both an indoor and outdoor pool located at the top of the commercial and facilities podium.

On the 38th floor, Tomorrow Square deviates from its solid base by rotating 45°along the Nanjing Road and People’s Park axis.  Because of this rotation, Tomorrow Square can appear radically different from different perspectives.  Walking around the building at a distance might even lead one to believe that the certain portions of the building swell and shrink like a mirage.  The deep Vs on the exterior preceding this twist provide buttressing for the building’s new orientation but also work as an adventurous expression of form.

Awards 
 The hotel won the Guinness World Records for its "Highest Library". 
 Listed in 2005, 2006, 2007, 2008 Condé Nast Traveler Gold List.

See also 
 Marriott International
 JW Marriott Hotels
 JW Marriott Kuala Lumpur
 JW Marriott Hong Kong

References

External links 

 JW Marriott Hotel Shanghai

Hotel buildings completed in 2003
JW Marriott Hotels
Hotels in Shanghai